L'Opéra Restaurant is a restaurant in Paris, France. Built into the Palais Garnier opera house's east facade, the restaurant is at the intersection of Gluck and Halévy streets, at the Place Jacques Rouché, in the 9th arrondissement. The restaurant premiered in 2011, 136 years after the Opera itself was opened.

History 

According to a restaurant press release, a restaurant had been proposed since the beginning of architect Charles Garnier's plans for the opera house. His project was not realized due to lack of funds.

Two other efforts to create a restaurant were made by theatre directors, in 1973 by composer Rolf Liebermann, followed in 1992 by businessman Pierre Bergé. These attempts did not succeed, also due to lack of financial support.

In March 2007, director Gérard Mortier created a competition for tenders, under an ambitious plan to bring opera to new audiences. After 16 months of negotiations, the proposal by Pierre François Blanc was accepted by the Opera on July 1, 2008.

After a year of preparations, the architectural project of Odile Decq received appraisal from the National Commission of Historic Monuments on June 15, 2009.

Menu 

The Opera's menu was developed by Chef Christophe Aribert. Previous head chefs include Yann Tanneau and Stéphane Bidi.

In January 2016, Chihiro Yamazaki became the new head chef. Chihiro Yamazaki has worked in Parisian restaurants such as Bellecour, Grand Hotel.

Architecture 

Located behind the east facade of the Opera Garnier, the restaurant occupies space where horse-drawn carriages entered to drop off opera patrons, when the building was first erected. The restaurant's interior was designed by French architect Odile Decq.

Given the historic monument status of the building, the architect was obliged to create the restaurant without making use of any original walls, pillars, or other structural elements. Decq has referred to the restaurant as a "phantom," possibly a reference to The Phantom of the Opera (a story set in, and inspired in part by real events at, the Opera Garnier).

References

External links 
L'Opéra Restaurant official homepage
L'Opéra Facebook page
La Boumette Facebook page

French restaurants in France
Restaurants in Paris
Buildings and structures in the 9th arrondissement of Paris
Tourist attractions in Paris
2011 establishments in France
Restaurants established in 2011